Eastern Maine Community College (EMCC) is a public community college in Bangor, Maine. It offers over 30 one- and two-year degree programs. The college offers technical, liberal arts, and career programs at the undergraduate level.

History 
Eastern Maine was established in 1966 by act of the Maine Legislature, as Eastern Maine Vocational Technical Institute (EMVTI). In 1989, the name was changed to Eastern Maine Technical College (EMTC), and changed again in 2003 from "Technical" to "Community". Located in the center of Bangor, Maine its72-acre campus is next to Interstate 95, a short distance from Eastern Maine Medical Center.

References

External links
 Official website

Universities and colleges in Penobscot County, Maine
Education in Bangor, Maine
Community colleges in Maine
Educational institutions established in 1966
USCAA member institutions
1966 establishments in Maine